Monechma serotinum is a species of plant in the family Acanthaceae. It is endemic to Namibia. Its natural habitat is rocky areas.

References

Acanthaceae
Flora of Namibia
Least concern plants
Taxonomy articles created by Polbot